This is a list of Dutch comedians who are internationally known or notable in the Netherlands.

Najib Amhali
Claudia de Breij
Hans Dorrestijn
André van Duin
Herman Finkers
Seth Gaaikema
Ronald Goedemondt
Paul Haenen
Raoul Heertje
Toon Hermans
Youp van 't Hek
Dolf Jansen
Freek de Jonge
Brigitte Kaandorp
Wim Kan
John Kraaijkamp, Sr.
Paul de Leeuwalso a singer
Theo Maassen
Bueno de Mesquita
Sylvia Millecam
Stefan Pop
Jörgen Raymannalso a television presenter and associated with Suriname
Wim Sonneveld
Hans Teeuwen
Micha Wertheim

See also

Cabaret
List of comedians
List of Dutch people

Dutch comedians
Comedians